Juan de Cervantes (24 June 1553 – 13 September 1614) was a Roman Catholic prelate who served as Bishop of Antequera (1608–1614).

Biography
Juan de Cervantes was born in México on 24 June 1553.
On 28 May 1608, he was appointed during the papacy of Pope Paul V as Bishop of Antequera. On 3 May 1609, he was consecrated bishop by Alfonso de la Mota y Escobar, Bishop of Tlaxcala. 
He served as Bishop of Antequera until his death on 13 September 1614.

See also
Catholic Church in Mexico

References

External links and additional sources
 (for Chronology of Bishops) 
 (for Chronology of Bishops) 

17th-century Roman Catholic bishops in Mexico
Bishops appointed by Pope Paul V
1553 births
1614 deaths